Artus Gouffier de Boissy (6 September 1475 – 13 May 1519 in Montpellier) was a French nobleman and politician. He was duke of Roannez and pair de France, count of Étampes, count of Caravaggio, baron of Passavant, of Maulévrier, of Roanne, of la Mothe-Saint-Romain, of Bourg-Charente and of Saint-Loup, lord of Oiron, of Villedieu-sur-Indre, of Valence and of Cazamajor. He served as Grand Master of France and attempted to negotiate a lasting peace between France and the House of Habsburg at the time of his early death.

Life
The eldest son of Guillaume Gouffier de Boisy, sénéchal of Saintonge, and of Philippine de Montmorency, he began his court career as a page to Charles VIII, who his father had served as preceptor. He accompanied Charles on the conquest of the Kingdom of Naples in 1495, as well as accompanying Louis XII of France to Italy.

Further reading 
Yves-Marie Bercé, « Artus Gouffier, grand maître de la Maison du Roi (vers 1472-1519) », Le Conseil du Roi de Louis XII à la Révolution, dir. Roland Mousnier, Paris, PUF, 1970, p. 207-230.
Etienne Fournial, Monsieur de Boisy. Grand maître de France sous François Ier, Lyon, Presses universitaires de Lyon, 1996, 149 p.
Arlette Jouanna, Philippe Hamon, Dominique Biloghi, Guy Le Thiec, La France de la Renaissance. Histoire et dictionnaire, Paris, Robert Laffont, 2001, article « Gouffier, famille », p. 851-854.
Pierre Carouge, « Artus (1474-1519) et Guillaume (1482-1525) Gouffier à l’émergence de nouvelles modalités de gouvernement », Les conseillers de François Ier, dir. Cédric Michon, Rennes, Presses universitaires de Rennes, 2011, p. 229-253.

1475 births
1519 deaths
Dukes of Roannais
Peers of France
Court of Francis I of France